Haldern Pop is an annual German open air music festival, first held in 1984. It takes place in Rees-Haldern (North Rhine-Westphalia).

Focus
The Haldern Pop Festival cannot be limited to one genre. The focus ranges from experimental metal, punk and indie-pop to jazz, classical concerts and German folk music. Played on several stages in the village of Haldern. Next to the main stage, a mirror tent on the festival grounds will be used for the performances. The other stages are the pub "Haldern Pop Bar", the St. Georg church, a youth center and a recording studio in the village.

History
The festival started as an annual party on the premises of Haldern's Old Riding Arena organized by local altar servers. During the first years (1981 - 1983), music was played from records only. The Haldern Pop festival was officially launched with live music on 23 June 1984.

The organizers want to remain true to their concept of "the small, cozy festival in the Lower Rhine area". The venue (an old horse range) should be kept, which limits the number of visitors to about 7000 people.

Haldern Pop has long been considered one of the most unique festivals in Europe. The curation of Haldern Pop by local festival organizer Stefan Reichmann has been awarded countless prizes over the years, including the "Helga Award" for best booking and best festival. In addition, the festival was highlighted as one of the best European festivals by the Guardian in 2011.

The Haldern Pop Festival has acquired the reputation of being a trend setter in Europe. Many bands such as Mumford & Sons (2009), IDLES (2017), Sam Smith (2014), or Muse (1999) made their first steps at the Haldern Pop Festival.

Lineups since 1984

Haldern Pop Bar
When a pub was to be abandoned in the middle of the village, a concept for an off-day hotel was developed. Since 2009, bands who have a day off between two gigs get free board and lodging in exchange for an evening concert "on a donation basis" at the Haldern Pop Bar. Besides unknown new artists who are just starting their careers, well-known bands such as Courtney Barnett or Nada Surf have already performed in the Pop Bar. Also bigger artists like George Ezra or Orville Peck have been performing here before their world career started. The venue also houses the event agency Raum 3, which organizes the festival, the Haldern Pop Recordings label, Haldern Pop Booking agency and the  Haldern Pop Shop record store, among others, so that a close cooperation is possible.

Record label
In 1999, the idea came up to release a sampler with music by the bands of the year. This led to the founding of the record label "Haldern Pop Recordings", which as yet released works of e.g. William Fitzsimmons, Giant Rooks, The Soundtrack Of Our Lives and Low Cut Connie.

Booking agency
In 2019, Haldern Pop founded a booking agency at the lower rhine area. The artists represented there include Mid City, Moon Hooch, Thirsty Eyes, and James Leg from Black Diamond Heavies

References

External links
 Official site (German, Dutch, English)

Rock festivals in Germany
Culture of North Rhine-Westphalia
Tourist attractions in North Rhine-Westphalia
Recurring events established in 1984